Baltika Stadium is a multi-purpose stadium in Kaliningrad, Russia, that was home to FC Baltika Kaliningrad. The capacity of the stadium used to be 14,660 before the 2018 renovation.

History

The stadium was originally within Königsberg, Germany. In 1892 philanthropist Walter Simon granted 6.83 hectares in Mittelhufen for the construction of an athletic field. Named Walter-Simon-Platz in his honor, the stadium hosted Königsberger STV in the early 20th century. The Yorck memorial was constructed near it in 1913.

Because Simon was Jewish, the Nazi Party renamed the stadium Erich-Koch-Platz after Gauleiter Erich Koch in 1933. The city became Russian after World War II. Columns from the portico of New Altstadt Church are included in Baltika Stadium's entrance.

After Baltika left for the Kaliningrad Stadium, stadium was retrofitted and reduced in capacity. All newer stands were removed and the place converted into sport fields for other activities. Artificial pitch was installed.

References

Football venues in Russia
Buildings and structures in Kaliningrad
FC Baltika Kaliningrad
Multi-purpose stadiums in Russia
Event venues established in 1892
Cultural heritage monuments of regional significance in Kaliningrad Oblast
1892 establishments in the Russian Empire